Government Polytechnic Karwar (GPK) is a polytechnic college in Uttara Kannada district of  Karnataka, India. Situated just a mile away from Karwar. The college is affiliated to Board of Technical Education, Recognized by Government of Karnataka. It is also approved by All India Council for Technical Education AICTE, New Delhi.

About The College 

Government Polytechnic Karwar (GPK) established in 1958. The  aims is to provide good technical education to rural area students.

The institution provides computer-based learning programs to meet the current needs of industry and business. The college is equipped with Cafeteria, Mess and Hostel facility along with College Library.

Courses 

Following are the courses in the college:
 Dip. in Automobile Engineering
 Dip. in Mechanical Engineering
 Dip. in Computer Science and Engineering
 Dip. in Electrical and Electronics Engineering
 Dip. in Civil Engineering.
 Dip. in Commercial Practice (Kan & Eng)

References 

Education in Karwar
Engineering colleges in Karnataka
Universities and colleges in Uttara Kannada district